Basaha  is a town in Beltar Basaha Municipality in Udayapur District in the Sagarmatha Zone of south-eastern Nepal. The formerly village development committee was merged to form a new municipality on 18 May 2014. At the time of the 1991 Nepal census it had a population of 7887 people living in 1464 individual households.

References

External links
UN map of the municipalities of Udayapur District

Populated places in Udayapur District